Richard Van Thomas (October 11, 1932 – September 4, 2010) was an American attorney and jurist who served as a justice of the Wyoming Supreme Court from December 1974 until his retirement in February 2001. He served as chief justice from 1985 to 1986.

Background
Born in Superior, Wyoming, he received his undergraduate degree from the University of Wyoming, and his law degree from the University of Wyoming College of Law, followed by an LL.M. in tax law from the New York University School of Law.

Career 
He returned to Wyoming serving in the Judge Advocate General's Corps for three years, worked in a law firm for a decade, and serving as the United States Attorney for the District of Wyoming for five years. Governor Stanley K. Hathaway appointed Thomas to the state supreme court in 1974. Thomas was described by a colleague as "one of the more cerebral justices this court has ever seen," and as "congenial and hardworking".

Personal life 
After retiring from the Wyoming Supreme Court, Thomas relocated to Rio Rancho, New Mexico. He died there in 2010.

References

1932 births
2010 deaths
People from Sweetwater County, Wyoming
People from Lingle, Wyoming
Politicians from Cheyenne, Wyoming
People from Rio Rancho, New Mexico
University of Wyoming alumni
New York University School of Law alumni
Wyoming lawyers
Wyoming Republicans
Justices of the Wyoming Supreme Court
United States Attorneys for the District of Wyoming
United States Air Force officers
20th-century American judges
20th-century American lawyers
20th-century American Episcopalians